Rialto was a restaurant in Harvard Square’s Charles Hotel owned by Jody Adams and Michela Larson.  Opened in 1994, it closed on June 22, 2016.  Originally, it was announced she would leave the restaurant in the hands of executive chef David Ladner but it was later announced it would close down.

They were known for their regional tasting menu, slow roasted Long Island duck and lobster and saffron bucatini.

Alumni
Carolyn Johnson Chef de cuisine
Joanne Chang was a pastry chef.

Awards and honors 
Boston (magazine) 1998 Best Mediterranean Restaurant, Contemporary
Esquire (magazine) named it one of the best restaurants in the country and one of The Top 20 New Restaurants in the Country
Gourmet (magazine) named it one of the world’s best hotel restaurants

References

Defunct restaurants in Massachusetts
Italian restaurants in the United States
Restaurants in Cambridge, Massachusetts
Harvard Square